Johann Christian Lossius (22 April 1743 in Liebstadt near Weimar – 8 January 1813 in Erfurt) was a German materialist philosopher.

He studied at Jena. Appointed professor of philosophy at Erfurt in 1770, he became professor of theology there in 1772.

Works
Physiche Ursachen des Wahren, 1775
Unterricht der gesunden Vernunft, 1776
Neues Philosophisches Reallexicon oder Wörterbuch der gesamten Philosophischen Wissenschaften, 1803

References

1743 births
1813 deaths
German philosophers
Materialists
German male writers